Richard Monk  (1833 – 2 May 1912) was a Member of Parliament in New Zealand.

Biography
Richard Monk was born in Lancashire, England, and relocated to Hokianga with his parents at a young age. He was educated in California, and returned to New Zealand to work in the timber industry, setting up a joinery company named Messrs Monk and Morgan. Some time later Monk went on to organise the Union Sash and Door Company which he remained with unil entering into politics in 1881.

He died at his home in Woodhill on 2 May 1912, aged 80, and was interred at Symonds Street Cemetery.

Political career

He represented the Waitemata electorate from the 1886 by-election after the death of William John Hurst to 1890 when he was defeated by Jackson Palmer; then from 1893 to 9 February 1894 when his election was declared void. He won the electorate again in 1896, and retired in 1902.

References

Members of the New Zealand House of Representatives
1833 births
1912 deaths
New Zealand MPs for Auckland electorates
Independent MPs of New Zealand
Unsuccessful candidates in the 1890 New Zealand general election
19th-century New Zealand politicians
Burials at Symonds Street Cemetery